Andharwara is a village in Vaishali district of the Indian state of Bihar. The panchayat offices are located at Panchayat bhawan in Baranti. Hajipur is the closest town, at a 10-11 kilometre distance, and closest station Akshywat Rai Nagar Near Suresh Prasad Chowk Bidupur RS
NH 322(National highway 322) is the closest highway.

Villages in panchayat
Andharwara comprises the following villages:

Relative location
The following map shows the location of Andhawara relative to other panchayats in the Hajipur constituency.
Neatest station Akshywat Nagar Bidupur Nearest Chowk:Suresh prasad Chowk near akshywat stadium Bidupur vaishali

References

Villages in Vaishali district